Walter Brown Shelley (6 February 1917 - 2009), was an American physician who made important contributions to the field of dermatology including itching, sweating, and piezogenic papules on the feet. He coined the word "keratinocyte".

References 

1917 births
2009 deaths
American dermatologists